To My Boy is an electropop duo consisting of Jack Snape and Sam White, who originate from Chesterfield and Liverpool respectively.  They met whilst both members were undergraduate students at Durham University, and are currently based in Liverpool. They have toured with Jakobínarína and released the album Messages (co-produced by James Ford) in 2007, as well as several singles. NME described their music around this time as ranging ‘from ultra-modern synth pop into brilliantly overblown camp ’80s electro’. Fitting with their electronic sound, their lyrics mainly deal with future technology and other science fiction themes. Through the bands Myspace page they also made an acoustic version of their debut briefly available for download. To My Boy's second album, The Habitable Zone, was released on 31 May 2010 on their own label. It was described by Gigwise as a 'more accomplished' album, in which they moved away from science fiction / futuristic themes to more organic, earth based lyrics.'

As of now, Jack Snape and Sam White Haven't released a statement about continuing their musical career or releasing any new music.

Discography

Albums

Singles
 "I am xRAY" / "Outerregions" (2006)
 "The Grid" (2006)
 "Model" (2007)
 "Fear of Fragility" (2007)
 "Us + the Wind" (2009)

References

External links
To My Boy on Myspace

English electronic music duos
Musical groups from Liverpool
XL Recordings artists
Musical groups established in 2005
Electropop groups
Alumni of Durham University